Todor Stanchev (9 August 1921 – 2002) was a Bulgarian sports shooter. He competed in the 25 m pistol event at the 1952 Summer Olympics.

References

External links
 
 
 

1921 births
2002 deaths
Bulgarian male sport shooters
Olympic shooters of Bulgaria
Shooters at the 1952 Summer Olympics
Place of birth missing